The 1974 Brazilian Grand Prix was a Formula One motor race held at Interlagos on 27 January 1974. It was race 2 of 15 in both the 1974 World Championship of Drivers and the 1974 International Cup for Formula One Manufacturers. The 32-lap race was won by McLaren driver Emerson Fittipaldi after he started from pole position. Clay Regazzoni finished second for the Ferrari team and Lotus driver Jacky Ickx finished in third place.

Qualifying

Qualifying classification

Race

Race summary 
Emerson Fittipaldi took pole position for his home race from Carlos Reutemann. The start of the race was delayed as the track had to be swept clear of broken glass from over-exuberant spectators' celebrations and then Arturo Merzario's engine failed. When it did start, the flag caught some of the field unawares. Reutemann and Ronnie Peterson took advantage of the confusion to sweep into the lead, but by lap 4,  Reutemann's tyres were going off. The race developed into a classic duel between Fittipaldi and Peterson, the Brazilian taking the lead on lap 16 and the Swede soon having to pit with a puncture (believed to be caused by some glass still left on the track).

Fittipaldi thus led Clay Regazzoni and Jacky Ickx until on lap 31 the heavens opened. With the track awash and the conditions dangerous, the race was red-flagged after 32 of the scheduled 40 laps. It was McLaren's second win of the year, but it was Ferrari who, with Regazzoni, topped the drivers' table - for the first time since March 1971.

Classification

Championship standings after the race

Drivers' Championship standings

Constructors' Championship standings

Note: Only the top five positions are included for both sets of standings.

References

Brazilian Grand Prix
Brazilian Grand Prix
Grand Prix
Brazilian Grand Prix